Parachute is the tenth full-length studio album by American country rap artist Ryan Upchurch. It was released on September 24, 2019, through Redneck Nation Records. The album debuted at number 52 on the Billboard 200, No. 6 on the Top Country Albums chart and No. 23 on the Top Rap Albums chart in the United States.

Track listing 
adapted from iTunes

Charts

References

External links
Upchurch© Parachute album on Redneck Nation

2019 albums
Upchurch (musician) albums